Brian Morley is a footballer who played as a full back in the Football League for Tranmere Rovers.

References

1960 births
Living people
People from Fleetwood
Association football fullbacks
English footballers
Blackburn Rovers F.C. players
Tranmere Rovers F.C. players
Northwich Victoria F.C. players
English Football League players